Kinston High School may refer to:

Kinston High School (Kinston, Alabama)
Kinston High School (Kinston, North Carolina)